Charles Larry "Justin" Lehr (born August 3, 1977) is an American former professional baseball pitcher. He played for the Oakland Athletics, Milwaukee Brewers, and Cincinnati Reds of Major League Baseball (MLB), as well as the Doosan Bears of the KBO League.

Early life
Lehr was born in Orange, California and graduated from West Covina High School in West Covina, California. He played college baseball at the University of California, Santa Barbara and the University of Southern California. In 1997, he played collegiate summer baseball in the Cape Cod Baseball League for the Yarmouth-Dennis Red Sox where he was named a league all-star.

Professional career
The Oakland Athletics selected Lehr in the 8th round of the 1999 Major League Baseball draft. He was acquired by the Milwaukee Brewers after the  season from the Athletics along with minor league outfielder Nelson Cruz in exchange for infielder Keith Ginter. Lehr has a career Major League ERA of 5.37 in 77 games, mostly in relief, he started 11 games for Cincinnati over the final two months of 2009. He also pitched for the Athletics and Brewers.

On February 4, in his start for Mexico of the Caribbean baseball series, Lehr gave up 5 runs while only recording one out, giving him an ERA of 162.00. Lehr spent  in the Seattle Mariners organization.

After signing a contract with the Cincinnati Reds, his contract was sold on May 24, to the Doosan Bears of the KBO. On August 7, he re-signed with the Reds. He became a free agent at the end of the season and signed a minor league contract with the Philadelphia Phillies on December 17, 2008. He was traded back to the Reds on May 23, 2009. On July 31, 2009, Lehr made his first career major league start against the Colorado Rockies. On August 5, 2009 Lehr pitched his first career shut out against the Chicago Cubs.

References

External links

Justin Lehr at Baseball Almanac
Career statistics and player information from Korea Baseball Organization

1977 births
Living people
American expatriate baseball players in Mexico
American expatriate baseball players in South Korea
Baseball players from California
Broncos de Reynosa players
Cañeros de Los Mochis players
Carolina Mudcats players
Cincinnati Reds players
Doosan Bears players
Kansas City Royals scouts
KBO League pitchers
Lehigh Valley IronPigs players
Leones del Caracas players
American expatriate baseball players in Venezuela
Louisville Bats players
Major League Baseball pitchers
Mexican League baseball pitchers
Midland RockHounds players
Milwaukee Brewers players
Modesto A's players
Naranjeros de Hermosillo players
Nashville Sounds players
Oakland Athletics players
Sportspeople from Orange, California
Sacramento River Cats players
Southern Oregon Timberjacks players
Tacoma Rainiers players
UC Santa Barbara Gauchos baseball players
University of Southern California alumni
USC Trojans baseball players
Yaquis de Obregón players
Yarmouth–Dennis Red Sox players
Sportspeople from West Covina, California